The Judo competition in the 1985 Summer Universiade were held in Kobe, Japan.

Medal overview

Events

Medals table

External links
 

1985 Summer Universiade
Universiade
1985
Universiade 1985